The 1990 Individual Ice Speedway World Championship was the 25th edition of the World Championship  The Championship was held on 10 and 11 March 1990 at the Ruddalen in Gothenburg in Sweden.  

Jarmo Hirvasoja became the first rider from Finland to take a World title in any discipline of speedway. Sergei Ivanov defeated Per-Olof Serenius in the race off for the bronze medal.

Classification

See also 
 1990 Individual Speedway World Championship in classic speedway
 1990 Team Ice Racing World Championship

References 

Ice speedway competitions
World